Blanford's rat (Madromys blanfordi) is a species of rodent in the family Muridae.  It is the only species in the genus Madromys. Known as වලිග සුදු වන මීයා  (meaning white-tailed wood rat) in Sinhala language.
It is found throughout India, Sri Lanka, and Bangladesh (in Satkhira District).

Description
Head and body 14–15 cm; tail is 19 cm. Dorsum grayish brown, darker on back and lighter on the sides. White underparts. Feet are white in adults, brownish white in young. two thirds of the tail is brown from the base then covered with long dense white furs.

References

External links

Old World rats and mice
Rats of Asia
Rodents of India
Mammals of Sri Lanka
Mammals described in 1881
Taxa named by Oldfield Thomas
Taxonomy articles created by Polbot